Alexander K. Becker (1818–1901) was a German botanist and entomologist.

In 1871 Becker conducted a study trip along the Volga, collecting and describing many endemic species of the Flora of Russia.

References

19th-century German botanists
German entomologists
1818 births
1901 deaths